Secrets is a 1933 American pre-Code Western film directed by Frank Borzage and starring Mary Pickford in her last film role. The film is a remake of Secrets (1924), a silent film starring Norma Talmadge, which was based on a 1922 play of the same name.

In 1930, Pickford had begun a remake of the Norma Talmadge Secrets titled Forever Yours with director Marshall Neilan and actors Kenneth MacKenna and Don Alvarado. After spending $300,000, Pickford stopped production and destroyed all the negatives because she was unhappy with the results.

Plot
Wealthy banker and shipowner William Marlowe and his wife Martha have their hearts set on marrying their daughter Mary to English aristocrat Lord Hurley. However, Mary has other ideas. She has fallen in love with John Carlton, one of her father's clerks. When Mr. Marlowe finds out, he fires John. John decides to go west to make his fortune, then return for Mary, but she insists on going with him. They elope.

The couple settle in California and after a while, have a herd of cattle and a baby boy. While John and hired hand Sunshine are away getting supplies, notorious outlaw Jake Houser and his gang show up and rustle the herd. John rounds up the other ranchers. They catch and hang three of the gang, including Jake's brother, but Jake gets away. Vowing revenge, Jake and his men attack the Carlton home. Help arrives and the rustlers are wiped out. The baby succumbs to illness during the gunfight.

Years pass, and the Carltons prosper greatly. Four more children are born, and John runs for governor of the state. They host a party on the night before the election at their mansion. Lolita Martinez, John's lover, scandalizes everyone by showing up. In private, she insists that Mary free John to marry her. Mary agrees, but John spurns his mistress and begs his wife's forgiveness; she gives it on condition that he tell her about all his prior lovers. Lolita makes public their affair, but John still wins the election.

Later, he becomes a senator, serving for thirty years in Washington, D.C. before deciding to retire and move back to California. This puzzles the couple's grown children; Mary explains that they want time for themselves, to enjoy secrets they can share with no one else. When their offspring still oppose their decision, the couple sneak away.

Cast
Mary Pickford as Mary Marlowe Carlton
Leslie Howard as John Carlton
C. Aubrey Smith as Mr. William Marlowe
Blanche Friderici as Mrs. Martha Marlowe (as Blanche Frederici)
Doris Lloyd as Susan Channing, Mary's friend
Herbert Evans as Lord Hurley
Ned Sparks as Sunshine
Allan Sears as Jake Houser
Mona Maris as Señora Lolita Martinez
Huntley Gordon as William Carlton as an Adult
Ethel Clayton as Audrey Carlton as an Adult
Bessie Barriscale as Susan Carlton as an Adult
Theodore von Eltz as Robert Carlton as an Adult

References

External links

1933 films
1933 Western (genre) films
American Western (genre) films
American black-and-white films
American films based on plays
Films directed by Frank Borzage
Sound film remakes of silent films
United Artists films
Films with screenplays by Frances Marion
1930s English-language films
1930s American films